Max Barthel (born 17 November 1893 in Loschwitz, Dresden — died 17 June 1975 in Waldbröl) was a German writer.

A factory worker, Barthel was a member of the socialist youth movement; he was a World War I frontline soldier from 1914 to 1918.

Trip to Russia
In 1920 he accepted a personal invitation from Karl Radek to travel to Moscow and attend the 2nd World Congress of the Comintern in 1920. He travelled as a stowaway to Estonia. Once here he mingled with Russian prisoners of war and thus was able to cross the border. Whilst in Russia, he also attended the International Conference of  the Young Communist International and met Vladimir Lenin. He attended the Kultintern, where he joined the Provisional  International Bureau.

In 1923 Barthel moved from the KPD (Communist Party of Germany) to the Social Democratic Party of Germany.  He drew closer to Nazism after the seizure of power; he was a reporter on Strength Through Joy trips, and a press correspondent during the war.  In 1922 he had worked Communist ideas into the poem "Arbeiterseele" (The Worker's Soul), but in 1934 his novel Das unsterbliche Volk (The Immortal Volk) described "the transformation of a German worker [himself] from a Communist to a follower of the Führer".  In a tone of resignation, Barthel titled his postwar autobiography Kein Bedarf an Weltgeschichte (No Need for World History; 1950).

Works
 Vom roten Moskau bis zum schwarzen Meer (From Red Moscow to the Black Sea, 1921) Berlin: Internationaler Jugendverlag
 Der Mensch am Kreuz. Roman nach dem Tagebuch eines katholischen Pfarrers (The Man on the Cross. A Novel based on the Diary of a Catholic Pastor, 1929) Berlin: Der Bücherkreis

Bibliography 
 Christian Zentner, Friedemann Bedürftig (1991). The Encyclopedia of the Third Reich.  Macmillan, New York.

References

1893 births
1975 deaths
Writers from Dresden
People from the Kingdom of Saxony
Communist Party of Germany politicians
Social Democratic Party of Germany politicians
German Army personnel of World War I
German male writers
Politicians from Dresden